Christiana is an unincorporated community and census-designated place in Rutherford County, Tennessee, United States. It has a post office, with ZIP code 37037. Christiana Middle School is located in the community. Both U.S. Route 231 (US 231) and Tennessee State Route 269 (SR 269) pass through the community.

The 2020 population of the CDP was 4,305.

Demographics

History
A post office called Christiana has been in operation since 1894. Besides the post office, Christiana contains several country stores and churches.

Notes

Unincorporated communities in Rutherford County, Tennessee
Unincorporated communities in Tennessee